The Opal (1851–1860) is a ten volume journal written, edited and printed by the patients of the Utica State Lunatic Asylum, circa 1851.  On its more than 3,000 pages, writers talked of their experiences and world views, giving great insight to the environment of New York's premiere state-operated Asylum, in Utica, New York.  Themes that continuously arose in the poetry, prose, political commentary, and articles about insanity include issues concerning medication, restraint, seclusion, human rights, liberty, overcoming oppression, and support.

History 
The idea for publishing a patients' journal likely originated during the superintendency of Dr Amariah Brigham, a firm believer in the curative value of mental occupation. Prior to the birth of The Opal, Brigham had included several pieces of patient writing in his American Journal of Insanity, which was also produced in the printing office of the institution. Though Brigham died in 1849, the decision of his successor (Dr Nathan Benedict) to launch a patient publication was clearly influenced by Brigham's ideas.

See also
Psychiatric survivors movement

References

External links
Picture of Opal front cover from 1851
Reiss, Benjamin. (2008). Theaters of madness insane asylums and nineteenth-century American culture. University of Chicago Press. OCLC 748889607.
The Opal (1851–1860). Edited by the Patients. New York State Lunatic Asylum. Utica, N.Y.: State Lunatic Asylum. HathiTrust.

19th-century publications
1851 establishments in New York (state)
Magazines established in 1851
Magazines disestablished in 1860
Magazines published in New York (state)
Defunct magazines published in the United States